Veeresh Malik is an Indian author, syndicated columnist and social worker. He is a Co-convenor and co-founder of the India Against Corruption anti-corruption movement. He writes a column for Chowk.com, Moneylife. Outlook India and Times of India

Achievements
1. Malik co-founded the India Against Corruption anti-corruption movement in 2007.

2. Malik is a leading RTI activist of India who helped in defining the scope of the Right to Information Act with the pathbreaking judgment in his case Indian Olympic Association vs Veeresh Malik & Ors. on 7 January 2010  "which confirmed that the IOC and the Commonwealth Games Organising Committee were public authorities for the purposes of the meaning of Section 2(h) of the Right to Information Act, 2005".

3. A former mariner, Malik  is an expert on piracy.

4. Mr Veeresh Malik is an expert on counterfeit currency. From May 2014 he along with another  associate began filing numerous (over 190) representations to India's financial authorities to "demonetise" India's much counterfeited Rs.500 and Rs.1,000 currency notes. The Bank finally acted on India Against Corruption's representations in Nov of 2016.

Books Authored 
1. Train to Pakistan - 2004

2. Just an Indian - the Man who Will not Bribe

3. Train to Goa

4. Essays on Pakistan from an Indian Point of View

5. Nirmal Hoon, Buccaneer of Turner Morrison: Life and times of the man who would not give up

6. Turbulence - my life in the Indian Merchant Navy Redux: Going out to sea?

7. BONDA! The 007 of dogs!!: Live and let live-dogs and humans

8. India's Online Public Grievance Mechanism: Case Studies 2013

References 

Year of birth missing (living people)
Place of birth missing (living people)
Living people
Indian columnists
Indian sailors